"Call Out My Name" is a song  by Canadian singer the Weeknd. It was sent to rhythmic contemporary radio in the United States on April 10, 2018, as the only single from his debut extended play, My Dear Melancholy (2018). The Weeknd co-wrote the song with his producer Frank Dukes, with Nicolas Jaar receiving writing credits for the sampling of his 2016 song "Killing Time".

Composition
According to musicnotes.com, the song is performed in the key of  E minor with a tempo of 45 beats per minute in compound duple time. The chords alternate between Gm and Dm. The Weeknd's vocals span two octaves, from D3 to D5.

Commercial performance
"Call Out My Name" earned the largest first-day Spotify stream count of any song released in 2018. The song was also streamed 6 million times on its first day on Apple Music. The song debuted at number four on the US Billboard Hot 100 on the issue dated April 14, 2018, becoming his eighth top ten entry. As of March 2020, the song has been certified 3× platinum in the United States.

Music videos
On the extended play's release day, the Weeknd uploaded a vertical video to Spotify. A lyric video was released three days later on April 2, 2018, depicting the Weeknd on various television screens. The official music video for "Call Out My Name" was released on April 12, 2018, and directed by Grant Singer.

Charts

Weekly charts

Year-end charts

Certifications

Release history

See also
 List of number-one songs of 2018 (Malaysia)

References

External links
 
 

2018 songs
2018 singles
Canadian Hot 100 number-one singles
Number-one singles in Canada
Number-one singles in Greece
Number-one singles in Malaysia
Songs written by Frank Dukes
Songs written by Nicolas Jaar
Songs written by the Weeknd
The Weeknd songs
Contemporary R&B ballads
Song recordings produced by Frank Dukes
Republic Records singles
XO (record label) singles
Vertically-oriented music videos